Thomas Forman (26 October 1879 – after 1911) was a professional footballer who played for Nottingham Forest, Manchester City, Sutton Town, Barnsley, Tottenham Hotspur and Sutton Junction.

Career 
Forman began his career at Nottingham Forest where he played in five matches between 1900 and 1902. 

In 1903 he joined Manchester City without playing a first team match. 

After a spell with non-League club Sutton United the outside left signed for Barnsley. Between 1907 and 1910, Forman appeared in 136 games and found the net on 18 occasions for the Yorkshire club; he appeared in both matches of the 1910 FA Cup Final in which he collected a losers' medal. 

In 1910 he joined Tottenham Hotspur, featuring in a further eight matches and scoring a single goal before ending his career at Sutton Town. His solitary goal on his Lilywhites debut in a 6-2 victory over Middlesbrough at White Hart Lane in February 1911 in the old First Division.

Personal life 
Forman served as a lance bombardier in the Royal Garrison Artillery during the First World War.

References

1879 births
Year of death missing
People from Basford, Nottinghamshire
Footballers from Nottinghamshire
Footballers from Nottingham
English footballers
Association football outside forwards
Nottingham Forest F.C. players
Manchester City F.C. players
Ashfield United F.C. players
Barnsley F.C. players
Tottenham Hotspur F.C. players
Sutton Junction F.C. players
English Football League players
British Army personnel of World War I
Royal Garrison Artillery soldiers
FA Cup Final players
Military personnel from Nottingham